State Route 142 (SR-142) is a state highway in the U.S. state of Utah.

Route description
Here the route turns east and travels just over  through Trenton and ends in Richmond at the intersection with US-91.

History
The state legislature created State Route 142 in 1933, connecting SR-69 (now SR-30) at Petersboro with Newton and Smithfield. SR-142 was moved to the present route of Newton to Clarkston at SR-170 in 1941, with the old alignment through downtown Newton to Smithfield becoming SR-218.

In 1969, SR-170, which ran from Clarkston via Trenton to Richmond was absorbed into SR-142, and SR-170 was deleted. This completed the current route of SR-142 as it runs today.

Major intersections

References

External links

 

 142
142